Magnesium citrate (3:2) (3 magnesium atoms per 2 citrate molecules), also called trimagnesium bicitrate, trimagnesium dicitrate, trimagnesium citrate, or the ambiguous name magnesium citrate. The substance magnesium citrate usually has water molecules attached to it. It is a (hydrated) salt of magnesium and citric acid.  It is not very soluble in water and has a bitter taste. It contains 16.2% elemental magnesium by weight. However, it can naturally only be available as nonahydrate (with 9 molecules of water to every molecule of trimagnesium bicitrate). This hydrated form only contains 12% elemental magnesium by weight.

References

Citrates
Magnesium compounds